Mondrian Doha is a Hotel at West Bay Lagoon, Doha in Qatar. It is part of the Mandarin Oriental luxury hotel chain. The hotel was opened in 2017. Its interior was designed by Marcel Wanders.

References

External links
 Mondrian Hotel at Doha

Hotels in Qatar
Mandarin Oriental Hotel Group
Hotels established in 2017
2017 establishments in Qatar